Thabo Mamojele (born 29 July 1986) is a South African rugby union player who last played as a flanker or lock with Currie Cup side the .

Career

2013 Kings Super Rugby season
He was named in the  wider training squad for the 2013 Super Rugby season, but was subsequently released to the Vodacom Cup squad.

Golden Lions

References

Living people
1986 births
South African rugby union players
Eastern Province Elephants players
Leopards (rugby union) players
Sharks (Currie Cup) players
Southern Kings players
Golden Lions players
Rugby union locks
Rugby union players from Mpumalanga